Sukhaya is the name of several rural localities in Russia:
Sukhaya, Alexandrovsky District, Perm Krai, a settlement in Alexandrovsky District, Perm Krai
Sukhaya, Permsky District, Perm Krai, a village in Permsky District, Perm Krai